The 2013–14 Missouri Mavericks season is the fifth season of the Central Hockey League (CHL) franchise in Independence, Missouri, a suburb of Kansas City, Missouri.

Off-season

On July 11, 2013, the Mavericks announced the renewal of their affiliation agreement with the Chicago Wolves of the American Hockey League.

Regular season

On February 8, 2014, claim solo first place in the 2013–14 Central Hockey League Regular Season standings with a 6-3 win over the Allen Americans and a loss by the Rapid City Rush to the Denver Cutthroats  On March 5, 2014, after a 5–2 win against the Quad City Mallards, the Mavericks were the first team in the Central Hockey League to clinch a berth in the 2013–14 Central Hockey League Playoffs.  On March 25, 2014, after an 8–0 victory over the St. Charles Chill, the Mavericks, for the first time in team history, won the 2013–14 Governor's Cup for the best regular season record in the Central Hockey League.

Playoffs
On April 15, 2013, the #1-seeded Mavericks' 2013–14 season ended with a 4–3 Double Overtime loss to the #8-seeded Arizona Sundogs at home in Independence in Game 6 of the Ray Miron President's Cup Playoffs Opening round.  This series loss was the first time the Mavericks have been eliminated from the playoffs by a lower-seeded team.

Awards, records, and milestones

Transactions

Player signings and acquisitions off of waivers

Free agency loses, waivers and retirements

Trades

Transfers and on loan players

Player suspensions or placed on leave

Injured reserve

Roster at the end of the 2013-14 season
As of April 13, 2014.

|}

See also
 2013–14 CHL season

References

External links
 Missouri Mavericks Official Website 
 2013–14 Missouri Mavericks season at EliteProspects.com
 2013–14 Missouri Mavericks season at Pointstreak.com

Missouri Mavericks seasons
Missouri
Missouri
2013 in sports in Missouri
2014 in sports in Missouri